In complex geometry, a Hopf manifold   is obtained
as a quotient of the complex vector space
(with zero deleted) 
by a free action of the group  of
integers, with the generator  
of  acting by holomorphic contractions. Here, a holomorphic contraction
is a map 
such that a sufficiently big iteration 
maps any given compact subset of 
onto an arbitrarily small neighbourhood of 0. 

Two-dimensional Hopf manifolds are called Hopf surfaces.

Examples 
In a typical situation,  is generated
by a linear contraction, usually a diagonal matrix 
, with 
a complex number, . Such manifold
is called a classical Hopf manifold.

Properties 
A Hopf manifold  
For , it is non-Kähler. In fact, it is not even
symplectic because the second cohomology group is zero.

Hypercomplex structure 
Even-dimensional Hopf manifolds admit
hypercomplex structure.
The Hopf surface is the only compact hypercomplex manifold of quaternionic dimension 1 which is not hyperkähler.

References 

Complex manifolds